Yemhi Memorial College, is a general degree college in Dimapur, Nagaland. It offers undergraduate courses in arts. This college is affiliated to Nagaland University. This college was established in 2013.

Departments

Arts
English 
History 
Political Science 
Sociology
Education

Accreditation
The college is recognized by the University Grants Commission (UGC).

References

External links
https://yemhimemorialcollege.com/

Colleges affiliated to Nagaland University
Universities and colleges in Nagaland
Educational institutions established in 2013
2013 establishments in Nagaland